The Bengal fox (Vulpes bengalensis), also known as the Indian fox, is a fox endemic to the Indian subcontinent from the Himalayan foothills and Terai of Nepal through southern India, and from southern and eastern Pakistan to eastern India and southeastern Bangladesh.

Appearance

Vulpes bengalensis is a relatively small fox with an elongated muzzle, long, pointed ears, and a long, bushy tail. The pelage ranges in color from buff to silver-gray with an overall grizzled effect; the dorsal pelage is mostly grayish and paler ventrally. The legs tend to be brownish or rufous, and the underparts light, a pale sand or ginger shade.

The Bengal fox is more daintily built than the red fox (V. vulpes), and can readily be recognized by its bushy, black-tipped tail, which is around 50–60% of the length of the head and body.

The backs of the ears are dark brown with a black margin, and white inside. The ears have the same colour as the nape or maybe darker, but not having a dark patch as in V. vulpes. Its rhinarium is naked and the lips are black. The muzzle is pointy, and there may be a dark smudged marking along the upper part of muzzle in front of eyes. Extensive variation in coat colour exists across populations and seasonally within populations, but generally varies from grey to pale brown.

The genus Vulpes can be separated from Canis and Cuon in the Indian region by the flat forehead between the postorbital processes and not inflated by air cells. The processes themselves are slightly concave with a raised anterior edge (convexly round in other canids). The canine teeth are longer.

Distribution and habitat

The Bengal Fox is endemic to the Indian subcontinent, ranging from the Himalayan foothills and Terai of Nepal through the South portion of the Indian Peninsula (but the western and east Ghats are not included) and from southern and eastern Pakistan to eastern India and southeastern Bangladesh. In Nepal and northeast India, it occurs up to 1,500 meters long. It was not reported from Afghanistan or Iran or from the Western Ghats, India.

Its range is bounded by the Himalayas and the Indus River valley. It favors semiarid, flat to undulating land, bush and short grassland habitats. It avoids dense forests, steep terrain, tall grasslands and true deserts. It is relatively widespread in low rainfall areas where the vegetation is usually scrub, thorn or dry deciduous forests, or short grasslands. In the Indian peninsula, the species is confined to plains and open scrub forests. It was considered to be a habitat generalist, but it shows a strong preference for semiarid, short grassland habitats at multiple scales.

Behaviour and ecology

Bengal foxes are predominantly crepuscular and nocturnal; while individuals may sometimes become active during cool periods of daytime, they typically spend warmer daylight hours under vegetation or in subterranean dens. They use three distinct types of den: basic, compact dens with two openings used for short rest periods, complex dens with multiple openings, and dens under rocks or rock crevices. The basic social unit of the Bengal Fox is the breeding pair, formed by a pair of bonds that can last for many years. Larger aggregations may occur while grown pups linger longer than average in the natal community. Other findings indicate that Bengal foxes can sometimes be more social. Female Bengal foxes were reported to share dens during lactation and four adult foxes were seen emerging from the same den.

Bengal foxes are not especially suspicious of humans and can be found near human habitation. They are easy to tame.

Diet 

Bengal foxes are omnivorous and opportunistic feeders, feeding primarily on insects, small mammals, reptiles, small birds, and fruits.

Their diet consists mainly of orthopterans, termites, ants, beetles, spiders, soft-furred rat (Millardia meltada), little Indian field mouse (Mus booduga), Indian gerbil (Tatera indica), Indian mynah (Acridotheres tristis), grey partridge (Francolinus ponticerianus) and ashy-crowned finch lark (Eremopterix griseus). Less common prey items include ground lizards, oriental rat snake (Ptyas mucosa), Madras hedgehog (Paraechinus nudiventris) and Indian hare (Lepus nigricollis). They feed on fruits of ber (Ziziphus mauritiana), neem (Azadirachta indica), mango (Mangifera indica), jambu (Syzygium cumini) and banyan (Ficus benghalensis). The Bengal fox is also considered to be a predator of eggs and possibly bustard chicks. Scats of young pups indicated that they primarily feed rodents.

Communication
Bengal foxes make a wide range of vocalizations. A common vocalization is a "chattering cry" that seems to have a significant role in establishing territoriality and may also be used as a warning call. They also growl, whimper, whine and make a sound which could be called a growl-bark. In reaction to humans, yapping or baying has also been observed. The Bengal fox does not appear to have latrine behaviour, a feature seen in some social canids, in which all members defecate at specific spots. They can be heard howling in the night in groups.

Reproduction

Bengal foxes are thought to form long-term monogamous pairs, but this supposition is based on scarce evidence and extra-pair copulations are known to occur. During the breeding season, males vocalize intensely during the night and at dusk and dawn. Throughout most of its range, the mating season occurs in December to January and after a gestation period of around 50–53 days, two to four pups are born in a den. Both parents participate in pup-rearing and protection. Aggregations of grown foxes at den sites have been recorded when the dispersal has been delayed, although the presence of helpers has not been observed. Pups may sometimes be nursed by multiple females, but the relationship between them is uncertain.

During the day, they tend to rest under shrubs and bushes, except in summer when they rest in dens. Play between pups is typical during the first 3 months and consists of vertical jumps, back arching, foreleg stabs, submissive displays, and play solicitation; the adult male sometimes plays with the young. In northwestern India, young people are scattered during the monsoon season, when the opportunities are plentiful. The pups are fully weaned about 3–4 months after emerging from the den. Pup mortality is high during the first few months.

Threats

While the Bengal fox is common, it usually occurs at low densities across its range, and populations may experience significant fluctuations due to prey abundance and disease (canine distemper virus and rabies, which have been confirmed to cause local population declines in western India). Any human disruptions can be tolerated, but with the increase of human populations and the increased growth of grasslands for agricultural and industrial use, the habitat of the Bengal fox is continually being reduced. The combination of the above causes, combined with disease and/or natural mortality, could potentially cause localized extirpation.

Lack of habitat protection is perhaps the greatest threat to the Bengal fox. For example, in southern India, less than 2% of potential Indian fox habitat is covered under the existing protected area network of the states of Karnataka and Andhra Pradesh . Hunting for its skin and flesh, as well as conversion of its grassland habitat to agriculture, industry, and increasingly bio-fuel plantations, have affected its population density. In addition, its body parts are used in traditional medicine, and in some areas it is eaten. They are hunted by the narikuruva tribes of southern India. In Karnataka, they are captured in rituals conducted during Sankranthi.

The populations of India are listed in the CITES Appendix III. The Indian Wildlife Conservation Act (1972 as amended to 2005) forbids the hunting of all wildlife and lists the Indian Fox in Schedule II. It does not apply to any particular category in the wildlife protection legislation of Nepal. It is listed as Least Concern in the IUCN Red List of Threatened Species.

References

External links
 IUCN/SSC Canid Specialist Group: Bengal Fox
 BBC – Science & Nature – Wildfacts – Indian fox, Bengal fox
 Status of Indian Fox

Bengal fox
Mammals of South Asia
Mammals of Bangladesh
Bengal fox
Taxa named by George Shaw
Fauna of the Thar Desert